CIS may refer to:

Computing

 Card information structure, formatting and organization data stored on a PC card
 Center for Internet Security, cybersecurity benchmarks, controls, practices and tools
 Center for Internet and Society (disambiguation) 
 Comodo Internet Security suite
 CompuServe Information Service, a US commercial online service
 Computer information systems, technologies which process data to solve business problems
 Configuration interaction singles, a quantum-chemical method for computing electronic states
 Contact image sensor, a technology developed for optical flatbed scanners
 Continuous ink system, for ink-jet printers

Education

 Calcutta International School, in India
 Canadian International School (disambiguation)
 Canadian International School (Bangalore)
 Canadian International School Vietnam
 Canadian International School of Sanya, in China
 Canadian International School (Singapore)
 Canadian International School (Tokyo)
 Cayman International School in Grand Cayman, Cayman Islands
 Cebu International School, in the Philippines
 Chinese International School, in Hong Kong
 Clifford International School, in Guangzhou, Guangdong, China
 College in the Schools, a program for high school students run by the University of Minnesota, U.S.
 Colombo International School, in Sri Lanka
 Communities In Schools, a U.S. federation of organizations combating educational dropout
 Copenhagen International School, in Denmark
 Council of International Schools, an international educational community organizations
 MIT Center for International Studies, in Massachusetts, U.S.

Health

 Cancer Information Service, a program of the US National Institutes of Health
 Carcinoma in situ, group of abnormal cells which may be cancer
 Clinically isolated syndrome, an initial neurological episode related to nerve tissue
 Combined intracavernous injection and stimulation test, a diagnostic procedure for erectile dysfunction

Organizations

American
 Center for Immigration Studies, an American anti-immigration think tank
 United States Citizenship and Immigration Services, a US government agency

British
 Christians in Science, a UK organization
 Co-operative Insurance Society, a British insurance company

Canadian
 Canadian Ice Service, a division of the Meteorological Service of Canada
 Canadian Identification Society, of police and civilians in crime scene investigation
 Canadian Interuniversity Sport, a former name of the national governing body of university sport

International
 Commonwealth of Independent States, a geopolitical region comprising a number of former Soviet Republics
 CIS national football team, football team representing the Commonwealth of Independent States

Other
 Centre for Independent Studies, an Australian libertarian think tank
 Centro de Investigaciones Sociológicas, a Spanish public research institute
 CIS Corps (Ireland), Communications and Information Services Corps, Irish combat support corps
 Cisalpino, Swiss–Italian railway company (CIS in timetables)
 Commonwealth Police (Commonwealth Investigation Service), an Australian security service, 1945 to 1960

Other uses

 Canton Island Airport, Kanton Island, Phoenix Islands, Kiribati, IATA code
 Capital Indoor Stadium, an indoor arena in Beijing, China
 Case Information Statement, a document used in US civil lawsuits
 cis (mathematics), a trigonometric mathematical function
 CIS Tower, a building in Manchester, England
 Common Intelligibility Scale, for speech intelligibility
 Community Innovation Survey, a series of surveys throughout the European Union
 Confederacy of Independent Systems, a fictional entity in the Star Wars universe
 Continuous Injection System, a fuel injection system developed by the Robert Bosch Group
 Copper indium selenide (CuInSe2), used in solar cells and semiconductors
 Corpus Inscriptionum Semiticarum, a corpus of Semitic inscriptions

See also
 Cis (disambiguation)